Sahuasiray (possibly from Quechua sawa matrimony, siray to sew,), Sawasiray, Colque Cruz or  Ccolque Cruz (possibly from Aymara and Quechua qullqi silver, money, Spanish cruz cross, "silver cross"), is one of the highest mountains in the Urubamba mountain range in the Andes of Peru, about  high. It lies in the Cusco Region, Calca Province, northwest of Calca. It is situated northeast of Chicón and Canchacanchajasa, southeast of Sirihuani and northwest of Condorhuachana.

See also
 List of Ultras of South America

References

External links
 "Nevado Sahuasiray, Peru" on Peakbagger

Mountains of Peru
Mountains of Cusco Region